Víctor Alcocer Gómez (March 23, 1917 – October 2, 1984) was a Mexican actor of film, television and voice-over. He dubbed many American TV characters into Spanish; "Herman Munster" from The Munsters is one of the most recognizable.

Selected filmography
Gangster's Kingdom (1948)
María Montecristo (1951)
Women Without Tomorrow (1951)
A Galician Dances the Mambo (1951)
Hotel Room (1953)
The Sword of Granada (1953)
I Want to Live (1953)
Drop the Curtain (1955)
Corazón salvaje (1956)
La Valentina (1966) ... Coronel
Corazón salvaje (1968)
Capulina Speedy Gonzalez (1970) ... El padre
National Mechanics (1972)
Length of War (1976)

References

External links

Mexican male film actors
Mexican male voice actors
Golden Age of Mexican cinema
1984 deaths
1917 births
20th-century Mexican male actors